The Auckland Pacing Cup which is sometimes referred to as the Auckland Trotting Cup or merely the Auckland Cup is a race held at Alexandra Park in Auckland, New Zealand for Standardbred horses. It is one of the two major harness races, along with the New Zealand Cup, held in New Zealand each year for the highest grade (Open class) pacers. It is a Group 1 championship race and has been won by many of the champion pacers in New Zealand.

Cup History

For most of its history the Auckland Cup has been raced in December, however at times it has been moved to other calendar dates such as:

 March, from 2006 until 2015, when it formed part of Auckland Cup Week, a carnival which includes feature Thoroughbred and greyhound racing.  As well as the March 2015 race (won by Christen Me) there was a second 2015 Auckland Cup raced in December (Have Faith In Me). Neither Christen Me or Have Faith In Me competed in the other race that year.
 January, in 1987 when won by Master Mood over 2,700m. In 1987 there was a second Auckland Cup in December, reverting to the 3,200m distance, won by Luxury Liner. Perhaps evidencing the competitiveness of the fields the January 1987 winner Master Mood could only place 9th in the December race whereas Luxury Liner, the winner in December could only achieve 6th in the earlier race.    
 February, for the 1978 to 1986 (inclusive) years.

From 2022 it was moved to late May, on the same race-card as the Rowe Cup for Open Class trotters.

Distance

The Auckland Cup is currently run over 3,200 metres from a mobile start.

The race started as a 3-mile event in 1890 to 1894 (inclusive) but it has traditionally been a 3,200m or 2 mile event apart from being a 2,700m journey for the races held from:

 March 2007 (won by Flashing Red) to March 2015 (Christen Me) before reverting to 3,200m for the 2016 year onwards.
 February 1978 (Sole Command) to January 1987 (Master Mood).

Stake money

The stake money for the Auckland Cup has fluctuated over the years:

 $400,000 for the 2022 year.
 $196,000 for the 2020 year.
 $245,000 for the 2019 year, which compared to $750,000 for the New Zealand Trotting Cup.
 $600,000 for the 2009 Auckland Cup ($1 million for the New Zealand Cup).

Famous winners

Champion horses which have won the Auckland Cup include Hall of Fame inductees and champions like:
 Cardigan Bay 
 Caduceus
 Young Quinn

The above horses went on to succeed in the United States and/or Canada.

It has been uncommon for female horses (mares) to win the Cup, the most recent being:

 Amazing Dream (2020).
 Flight South (2000).
 Kate's First (1997).

However the “Queen of the Park” Delightful Lady won the race twice, in 1980 and 1981.

Australian participation
As with the New Zealand Trotting Cup Australian trained horses sometimes make the journey to Alexandra Park, such as the following winners:

 Themightyquinn (a former NZ horse) in 2011 and 2013
 Gammalite in 1982

Records
Most wins by a driver:
 8 - Tony Herlihy (1986, 1987, 1988, 1991, 1993, 1994, 1996, 2008)
 6 - P T Wolfenden (1960, 1961, 1963, 1978, 1983, 1984)
 4 - J (James) Bryce jnr (1943, 1945, 1948, 1949)
 6 - Mark Purdon (2002, 2009, 2016, 2018, 2019, 2020)

Most wins by an owner:
 4 - R A McKenzie (1957, 1959, 1971, 1985)

Winners list

See also

 Harness racing in New Zealand
 New Zealand Horse of the Year
 New Zealand Trotting Cup
 New Zealand Free For All
 New Zealand Trotting Derby
 Great Northern Derby
 Dominion Handicap
 Rowe Cup
 Inter Dominion Pacing Championship
 Inter Dominion Trotting Championship
 Miracle Mile Pace
 Noel J Taylor Mile
 New Zealand Messenger
 Harness racing

References

Full list of Auckland Cup results - http://www.hrnz.co.nz

Horse races in New Zealand
Harness racing in New Zealand